A synchronous electric motor is an AC electric motor in which, at steady state, the rotation of the shaft is synchronized with the frequency of the supply current; the rotation period is exactly equal to an integral number of AC cycles. Synchronous motors contain multiphase AC electromagnets on the stator of the motor that create a magnetic field which rotates in time with the oscillations of the line current.  The rotor with permanent magnets or electromagnets turns in step with the stator field at the same rate and as a result, provides the second synchronized rotating magnet field of any AC motor. A synchronous motor is termed doubly fed if it is supplied with independently excited multiphase AC electromagnets on both the rotor and stator.

The synchronous motor and the induction motor are the most widely used types of AC motors. The difference between the two types is that the synchronous motor rotates at a rate locked to the line frequency since it does not rely on current induction to produce the rotor's magnetic field. By contrast, the induction motor requires slip: the rotor must rotate slightly slower than the AC alternations in order to induce current in the rotor winding. Small synchronous motors are used in timing applications such as in synchronous clocks, timers in appliances, tape recorders and precision servomechanisms in which the motor must operate at a precise speed; speed accuracy is that of the power line frequency, which is carefully controlled in large interconnected grid systems.

Synchronous motors are available in self-excited sub-fractional horsepower sizes to high power industrial sizes. In the fractional horsepower range, most synchronous motors are used where precise constant speed is required. These machines are commonly used in analog electric clocks, timers and other devices where correct time is required.
In higher power industrial sizes, the synchronous motor provides two important functions. First, it is a highly efficient means of converting AC energy to work. Second, it can operate at leading or unity power factor and thereby provide power-factor correction.

Type
Synchronous motors fall under the more general category of synchronous machines which also includes the synchronous generator.  Generator action will be observed if the field poles are "driven ahead of the resultant air-gap flux by the forward motion of the prime mover".  Motor action will be observed if the field poles are "dragged behind the resultant air-gap flux by the retarding torque of a shaft load".

There are two major types of synchronous motors depending on how the rotor is magnetized: non-excited and direct-current excited.

Non-excited

In non-excited motors, the rotor is made of steel.  At synchronous speed it rotates in step with the rotating magnetic field of the stator, so it has an almost-constant magnetic field through it.  The external stator field magnetizes the rotor, inducing the magnetic poles needed to turn it.  The rotor is made of a high-retentivity steel such as cobalt steel. These are manufactured in permanent magnet, reluctance and hysteresis designs:

Reluctance 

These have a rotor consisting of a solid steel casting with projecting (salient) toothed poles. Typically there are fewer rotor than stator poles to minimize torque ripple and to prevent the poles from all aligning simultaneously—a position that cannot generate torque. The size of the air gap in the magnetic circuit and thus the reluctance is minimum when the poles are aligned with the (rotating) magnetic field of the stator, and increases with the angle between them.  This creates a torque pulling the rotor into alignment with the nearest pole of the stator field.  Thus at synchronous speed the rotor is "locked" to the rotating stator field.  This cannot start the motor, so the rotor poles usually have squirrel-cage windings embedded in them, to provide torque below synchronous speed.  The machine starts as an induction motor until it approaches synchronous speed, when the rotor "pulls in" and locks to the rotating stator field.

Very small reluctance motors have low torque, and are generally used for instrumentation applications. Moderate torque, multi-horsepower motors use squirrel cage construction with toothed rotors. When used with an adjustable frequency power supply, all motors in the drive system can be controlled at exactly the same speed. The power supply frequency determines motor operating speed.

Hysteresis
These have a solid smooth cylindrical rotor, cast of a high coercivity magnetically "hard" cobalt steel. This material has a wide hysteresis loop (high coercivity), meaning once it is magnetized in a given direction, it requires a large reverse magnetic field to reverse the magnetization.  The rotating stator field causes each small volume of the rotor to experience a reversing magnetic field.  Because of hysteresis the phase of the magnetization lags behind the phase of the applied field.  The result of this is that the axis of the magnetic field induced in the rotor lags behind the axis of the stator field by a constant angle δ, producing a torque as the rotor tries to "catch up" with the stator field.  As long as the rotor is below synchronous speed, each particle of the rotor experiences a reversing magnetic field at the "slip" frequency which drives it around its hysteresis loop, causing the rotor field to lag and create torque.  There is a 2-pole low reluctance bar structure in the rotor. As the rotor approaches synchronous speed and slip goes to zero, this magnetizes and aligns with the stator field, causing the rotor to "lock" to the rotating stator field.

A major advantage of the hysteresis motor is that since the lag angle δ is independent of speed, it develops constant torque from startup to synchronous speed.  Therefore, it is self-starting and doesn't need an induction winding to start it, although many designs do have a squirrel-cage conductive winding structure embedded in the rotor to provide extra torque at start-up.   
   
Hysteresis motors are manufactured in sub-fractional horsepower ratings, primarily as servomotors and timing motors. More expensive than the reluctance type, hysteresis motors are used where precise constant speed is required.

Permanent-magnet
A permanent-magnet synchronous motor (PMSM) uses permanent magnets embedded in the steel rotor to create a constant magnetic field. The stator carries windings connected to an AC supply to produce a rotating magnetic field (as in an asynchronous motor). At synchronous speed the rotor poles lock to the rotating magnetic field. Permanent magnet synchronous motors are similar to brushless DC motors. Neodymium magnets are the most commonly used magnets in these motors. Although in the last few years, due to rapid fluctuation in the prices of neodymium magnets, a lot of research has been looking at ferrite magnets as an alternative. Due to the inherent characteristics of the currently available ferrite magnets, the design of the magnetic circuit of these machines needs to be able to concentrate the magnetic flux, one of the most common strategies is the use of spoke type rotors. Currently, the new machines that use ferrite magnets have lower power density and torque density, when compared with machines that use neodymium magnets.

Permanent magnet motors have been used as gearless elevator motors since 2000.

Most PMSMs require a variable-frequency drive to start. However, some incorporate a squirrel cage in the rotor for starting—these are known as line-start or self-starting PMSMs. These are typically used as higher-efficiency replacements for induction motors (owing to the lack of slip), but need to be specified carefully for the application to ensure that synchronous speed is reached and that the system can withstand the torque ripple during starting.

Permanent magnet synchronous motors are mainly controlled using direct torque control and field oriented control. However, these methods suffer from relatively high torque and stator flux ripples. Predictive control and neural network controllers are recently developed to cope with these issues.

DC-excited motors

Usually made in larger sizes (larger than about 1 horsepower or 1 kilowatt)  these motors require direct current (DC) supplied to the rotor for excitation.  This is most straightforwardly supplied through slip rings, but a brushless AC induction and rectifier arrangement may also be used.  The direct current may be supplied from a separate DC source or from a DC generator directly connected to the motor shaft.

Control techniques 
A permanent magnet synchronous motor and reluctance motor requires a control system for operating (VFD or servo drive).

There is a large number of control methods for PMSM, which is selected depending on the construction of the electric motor and the scope.

Control methods can be divided into:

Sinusoidal

 Scalar
 Vector (FOC, DTC)

Trapezoidal

 Open loop
 Closed loop (with and without Hall sensor)

Synchronous speed
The synchronous speed of a synchronous motor is given:
in RPM, by:
 
and in rad·s−1, by:
 

where:
  is the frequency of the AC supply current in Hz,
  is the number of magnetic poles,
  is the number of pole pairs (rarely, planes of commutation), .

Examples
A single-phase, 4-pole (2-pole-pair) synchronous motor is operating at an AC supply frequency of 50 Hz. The number of pole-pairs is 2, so
the synchronous speed is:

A three-phase, 12-pole (6-pole-pair) synchronous motor is operating at an AC supply frequency of 60 Hz. The number of pole-pairs is 6, so the synchronous speed is:

The number of magnetic poles, is equal to the number of coil groups per phase.  To determine the number of coil groups per phase in a 3-phase motor, count the number of coils, divide by the number of phases, which is 3. The coils may span several slots in the stator core, making it tedious to count them. For a 3-phase motor, if you count a total of 12 coil groups, it has 4 magnetic poles. For a 12-pole 3-phase machine, there will be 36 coils. The number of magnetic poles in the rotor is equal to the number of magnetic poles in the stator.

Construction

The principal components of a synchronous motor are the stator and the rotor. The stator of synchronous motor and stator of induction motor are similar in construction. With the wound-rotor synchronous doubly fed electric machine as the exception, the stator frame contains wrapper plate. Circumferential ribs and keybars are attached to the wrapper plate. To carry the weight of the machine, frame mounts and footings are required. When the field winding is excited by DC excitation, brushes and slip rings are required to connect to the excitation supply. The field winding can also be excited by a brushless exciter. Cylindrical, round rotors, (also known as non salient pole rotor) are used for up to six poles. In some machines or when a large number of poles are needed, a salient pole rotor is used. The construction of synchronous motor is similar to that of a synchronous alternator. Most of the synchronous motors construction uses the stationary armature and rotating field winding. This type of construction as an advantage than DC motor type where the armature used is of rotating type.

Operation

The operation of a synchronous motor is due to the interaction of the magnetic fields of the stator and the rotor. Its stator winding, which consists of a 3 phase winding, is provided with a 3 phase supply, and the rotor is provided with a DC supply. The 3 phase stator winding carrying 3 phase currents produces 3 phase rotating magnetic flux (and therefore a rotating magnetic field). The rotor locks in with the rotating magnetic field and rotates along with it. Once the rotor field locks in with the rotating magnetic field, the motor is said to be in synchronization.  A single-phase (or two-phase derived from single phase) stator winding is possible, but in this case the direction of rotation is not defined and the machine may start in either direction unless prevented from doing so by the starting arrangements.

Amortisseur winding
Once the motor is in operation, the speed of the motor is dependent only on the supply frequency. When the motor load is increased beyond the breakdown load, the motor falls out of synchronization and the field winding no longer follows the rotating magnetic field. 

Since the motor cannot produce (synchronous) torque if it falls out of synchronization, practical synchronous motors have a partial or complete squirrel-cage damper called an amortisseur winding to stabilize operation and facilitate starting. 

Because this winding is smaller than that of an equivalent induction motor and can overheat on long operation, and because large slip-frequency voltages are induced in the rotor excitation winding, synchronous motor protection devices sense this condition and interrupt the power supply (out of step protection).

Starting methods
Above a certain size, synchronous motors are not self-starting motors. This property is due to the inertia of the rotor; it cannot instantly follow the rotation of the magnetic field of the stator. Since a synchronous motor produces no inherent average torque at standstill, it cannot accelerate to synchronous speed without some supplemental mechanism.

Large motors operating on commercial power frequency include a squirrel-cage induction winding which provides sufficient torque for acceleration and which also serves to damp oscillations in motor speed in operation. Once the rotor nears the synchronous speed, the field winding is excited, and the motor pulls into synchronization. Very large motor systems may include a "pony" motor that accelerates the unloaded synchronous machine before load is applied. Motors that are electronically controlled can be accelerated from zero speed by changing the frequency of the stator current.

Very small synchronous motors are commonly used in line-powered electric mechanical clocks or timers that use the power line frequency to run the gear mechanism at the correct speed.  Such small synchronous motors are able to start without assistance if the moment of inertia of the rotor and its mechanical load is sufficiently small [because the motor] will be accelerated from slip speed up to synchronous speed during an accelerating half cycle of the reluctance torque." Single-phase synchronous motors such as in electric wall clocks can freely rotate in either direction unlike a shaded-pole type. See Shaded-pole synchronous motor for how consistent starting direction is obtained.

The operational economics is an important parameter to address different motor starting methods. Accordingly, the excitation of the rotor is a possible way to solve the motor starting issue. In addition, modern proposed starting methods for large synchronous machines include repetitive polarity inversion of the rotor poles during startup.

Applications, special properties, and advantages

Use as synchronous condenser

By varying the excitation of a synchronous motor, it can be made to operate at lagging, leading and unity power factor. Excitation at which the power factor is unity is termed normal excitation voltage. The magnitude of current at this excitation is minimum. Excitation voltage more than normal excitation is called over excitation voltage, excitation voltage less than normal excitation is called under excitation. When the motor is over excited, the back emf will be greater than the motor terminal voltage. This causes a demagnetizing effect due to armature reaction.

The V curve of a synchronous machine shows armature current as a function of field current. With increasing field current armature current at first decreases, then reaches a minimum, then increases. The minimum point is also the point at which power factor is unity.

This ability to selectively control power factor can be exploited for power factor correction of the power system to which the motor is connected. Since most power systems of any significant size have a net lagging power factor, the presence of overexcited synchronous motors moves the system's net power factor closer to unity, improving efficiency. Such power-factor correction is usually a side effect of motors already present in the system to provide mechanical work, although motors can be run without mechanical load simply to provide power-factor correction. In large industrial plants such as factories the interaction between synchronous motors and other, lagging, loads may be an explicit consideration in the plant's electrical design.

Steady state stability limit

where,
 is the torque
 is the torque angle
 is the maximum torque

here,

When load is applied, torque angle  increases. When  = 90° the torque will be maximum. If load is applied further then the motor will lose its synchronism, since motor torque will be less than load torque. The maximum load torque that can be applied to a motor without losing its synchronism is called steady state stability limit of a synchronous motor.

Other
Synchronous motors are especially useful in applications requiring precise speed or position control:
 Speed is independent of the load over the operating range of the motor.
 Speed and position may be accurately controlled using open loop controls (e.g. stepper motors).
 Low-power applications include positioning machines, where high precision is required, and robot actuators.
 They will hold their position when a DC current is applied to both the stator and the rotor windings.
 A clock driven by a synchronous motor is in principle as accurate as the line frequency of its power source. (Although small frequency drifts will occur over any given several hours, grid operators actively adjust line frequency in later periods to compensate, thereby keeping motor-driven clocks accurate; see Utility frequency#Stability.)
 Record player turntables
 Increased efficiency in low-speed applications (e.g. ball mills).

Subtypes
 AC Polyphase synchronous motors
 Stepper motor (may be synchronous or not)
 Synchronous brushless wound-rotor doubly-fed electric machine

See also
 Clock drive
 Doubly fed electric machine
 Short circuit ratio

References

External links

 Synchronous motor animation

Electric motors
Synchronous machines